Fernando Díaz Pedroso (May 30, 1924 – Noviembre 20, 1994) was an outfielder in Negro league baseball between 1945 and 1950.

A native of Marianao, Cuba, Díaz made his Negro leagues debut in 1945 with the New York Cubans. He played five seasons with the club through 1950, was selected to the East–West All-Star Game in 1946, 1949 and 1950, and was part of New York's 1947 Negro World Series championship squad. Díaz died in Villahermosa , Tabasco in 1994 at age 70.

References

External links
 and Seamheads

1924 births
1994 deaths
Cuban emigrants to the United States
New York Cubans players
Baseball players from Havana